As a candidate country of the European Union, Iceland (IS) is included in the Nomenclature of Territorial Units for Statistics (NUTS). The three NUTS levels are:
 NUTS-1: IS0 Iceland
 NUTS-2: IS00 Iceland
 NUTS-3: Capital area / Rest of country
 IS001 Höfuðborgarsvæðið (Capital Region)
 IS002 Landsbyggð (rest of country)

Below the NUTS levels, there are two Local Administrative Unitary levels (LAU-1: regions, LAU-2: municipalities).

See also
 Administrative divisions of Iceland
 ISO 3166-2 codes of Iceland
 FIPS region codes of Iceland

Sources
 Hierarchical list of the Nomenclature of territorial units for statistics - NUTS and the Statistical regions of Europe
 Overview map of EFTA countries - Statistical regions at level 1
 ÍSLAND - Statistical regions at level 2
 ÍSLAND - Statistical regions at level 3
 Correspondence between the regional levels and the national administrative units
 Regions of Iceland, Statoids.com

Iceland
Subdivisions of Iceland